Dominic Fumusa (born September 13, 1969) is an American stage and screen actor known for starring in the Showtime comedy-drama series Nurse Jackie.

Early life
Fumusa was born and raised in Dane County, Wisconsin, to a large family as one of 10 siblings. He graduated from McFarland High School in 1987. He earned a Bachelor of Arts degree in political science from Lawrence University and a master's degree in fine arts from the University of Illinois at Urbana–Champaign in 1994.

Career
Fumusa began his acting career in the Chicago theatre scene, before moving to New York and making his Broadway debut in 1998 in a revival of Wait Until Dark opposite Marisa Tomei and Quentin Tarantino. He has originated roles on the Broadway stage in such plays as the Tony Award-winning Take Me Out and Tape. He previously had a recurring role in As the World Turns, and guest starred as Carrie Bradshaw's highly critical ex-boyfriend Jim in the episode of the HBO series Sex and the City, titled "Frenemies". He starred in the 2016 film, 13 Hours: The Secret Soldiers of Benghazi, directed by Michael Bay.

Fumusa portrays FBI Special Agent Ray Conlin in season 6 of the Showtime drama series Homeland.

Personal life
Fumusa is the son of Clara and Peter Fumusa. He is married to stage actress Ilana Levine; they have two children.
 Fumusa is a convert to Judaism, the religion of his wife.

Filmography

References

External links 

Male actors from Wisconsin
American male television actors
American male stage actors
American male film actors
Converts to Judaism
1969 births
Living people
People from McFarland, Wisconsin
20th-century American male actors
21st-century American male actors